Urinboy Rahmonberdievich Rakhmonov (4 (17) March 1910 – 5 October 1980) – Soviet Kyrgyz actor and theatrical figure, the founder of Bobur theater in the city of Osh, writer, poet.

Biography
Urinboy Rakhmonov was born 4 March 1910 in the city of Osh, in the family of employees. His father was the founder Rahmonberdi Madazimov theater movement in Kyrgyzstan, the first founder and organizer of the theater of the Osh city, a revolutionary, an active participant in the fight against Basmachi. When Urinboyu Rakhmonov was 17 years old, in 1927, he began his artistic career in the theater Osh. He worked in the theater actor, in addition, in the difficult years of formation and organization of the theater additionally served ten positions: he was an assistant director, playwright, singer, musician, prompter, artist, makeup artist, the poet, wrote small plays and poems for the songs by that at the time dancing People's Artist of the Kirghiz SSR first dancer Roziya Muminova.

Urinboy Rakhmonov from 1949 to 1952 he worked as the executive secretary of Kyzyl-Kyshtakskogo village council, from 1952 to 1965 worked as the chief of post office in the village of Kyzyl-Kyshtak, Kara-Suu District. Since 1965 he worked in the trading system. But, despite the fact that he was in 1949, he went to the theater for a long time, up until 1958, after working freelance played in the theater and the main bit parts. Published his poems. I brought up 12 children. The eldest son Dildorbek also worked in Osh Babur Theatre actor and played bit parts in two films. Another son Darvishbek palvan Rakhmonov has also dedicated his life to the service of art and works artistic director circus troupe "Kaldirgoch" (Swallow).

Played the role of theater in Osh
1927 – K.Yashin "Friends."
1928 – K.Yashin "Inside."
1929 – Gulom Zafariy "Halima", K.Yashin "Aji-Aji".
1930 – Umarjon Ismoilov "Stories in the cotton field"
1931 – Nikolai Gogol "Marriage".
1932 – Mannon Uygur "Translator".
1933 – Hajibeyov "Arshin Mal Alan".
1934 – Nikolai Gogol "The Government Inspector".
1935 – Nazir Safarov, Ziyo Said "History says", K.Yashin "Will burn".
1936 – Zh.Turusbekov "Instead of death", K. Trenyov "Lyubov Yarovaya", Tozhizoda "Komsomol platoon"
1937 – Schiller "Intrigue and Love", Sh.Hurshid "Farhad and Shirin".
1938 – C. Goldoni "Servant of Two Masters", Sabir Abdullah, "Saber Uzbekistan".
1939 – Bill-Belotserkovskiy "Border" Hamza "Rich and laborer", Sabir Abdullah, "Tahir and Zuhra".
1940 – Hamza "Holiskhon", K.Yashin "Buran".
1941 – K.Yashin and M.Muhamedov "Gulsara", Khurshid "Layla and Majnun", Sabir Abdullah "Kurban Umarov".
1942 – K.Yashin "Death to the invaders!", Hamza "Tricks of Maysara", А. Korniychuk "Frontline".
1943 – Sabir Abdullah "Davron ata", Umarjon Ismoilov "Zafar".
1944 – K.Yashin "Nurkhon", M. Ordubadi "Bride 5 som".
1945 – Uygun "Song of Life".
1946 – Mukhtarov "Honor the women".
1947 – Uygun "Spring", Khurshid "Farhad and Shirin".
1948 – K. Trenyov "Red Tie", Uygun "Song of Life", Uygun "Oltinkol".
1949 – Fatkhullin "Petals", Hamid Olimjon "Semurg".
1950 – Akram Ismail "Justice", Sabir Abdullah "Alpamysh".
1951 – Bokonbaev "Toktogul", Khurshid "Layla and Majnun".
1952 – Shukur Sadulla "Eriltosh", Mahmoud Rahmon "Joy", Abdulla Qahhor "Silk Suzani".
1953 – Izzat Sultan "Alisher Navoiy", Lysenko "Natalka Poltavka", K.Yashin "Nurkhon".
1954 – Shukur Sadulla "Feast on the field", Bahrom Rahmonov "Heart Secrets".
1955 – K.Yashin "Oftobhon", Rabindranath Tagore "The Girl of the Ganges River"
1956 – K.Yashin "Ravshan and Zulhumor", Fatkhullin "Love for the motherland", Ahmadov "Chest of secrets"
1957 – Sabir Abdullah "Alpamysh", Samad Vurgun "Yulduz".
1958 – Hamid Olimjon "Oygul and Bakhtiyor", M.Shatrov "In the name of the revolution"

In addition, he has participated in numerous concerts.

Theatre actor Memory
By the decision of the local authorities has been immortalized memory of the founder of the theater by assigning its name outside of Osh Region.

In honor of Urinboy Rakhmonov street was named in the village of Kyzyl-Kyshtak Kara-Suu District, Osh Region.

Personal life
Father: Rahmonberdi Madazimov (1875–1933). Mother: Bibihon (1884–1922). First Spouse: Tursunhon Tuychiboeva (1918–1954). Children: Dildorbek (1941), Diloromhon (1943), Davlatbek (1949–2006), Darvishbek (1952), Bahridilhon (1954), Donishbek (1957), Dilfuzahon (1960), Stalin (1962), Mahfuzahon (1964), Dilrabo (1971).

Write a book
"The history of the genus Rakhmonov thousanders Osh and Uratepa city rights", 420, Osh, 2016

Literature
A. Abdugafurov "Osh Academic Theatre", 2010, the city of Osh, page 1, 3, 42.

See also
 Osh State Academic Uzbek Music and Drama Theater named after Babur
 Zhurahon Rahmonberdievich Rahmonov
 Rahmonberdi Madazimov

References

External links
 Centrasia Persons
 Celebrity Biographies
 History of theater
 Verses Urinboy Rakhmonov Uzbek language
 Verses Urinboy Rakhmonov Uzbek language
 Essay

1910 births
1980 deaths
Kyrgyzstani male actors
Uzbekistani male actors
Writers from Osh
Uzbek-language poets
20th-century Uzbekistani poets
Kyrgyzstani poets
Uzbekistani male poets
20th-century male writers
20th-century Kyrgyzstani writers
20th-century Kyrgyzstani actors
20th-century Uzbekistani male actors